Milan Jović (Serbian Cyrillic: Милан Јовић; born 16 October 1975) is a retired Serbian professional footballer. 

He played for several clubs in Serbia, namely FK Partizan, Sartid 1913 and FK Vojvodina, before moving to Russia. He made his debut in the Russian Premier League in 2000 for FC Spartak Moscow.

Honours
 Russian Premier League champion: 2000.

References

1975 births
Sportspeople from Valjevo
Living people
Serbian footballers
FK Partizan players
FK Smederevo players
FK Vojvodina players
FC Spartak Moscow players
FC Chernomorets Novorossiysk players
FC Rostov players
FC Saturn Ramenskoye players
Russian Premier League players
Expatriate footballers in Russia
Association football midfielders